Eversmuiža Manor is a manor in Cibla Parish, Cibla Municipality in the historical region of Latgale, in Latvia.

History 
It is known that Polish nobles Karnicki owned lands in estate Cibla (Eversmuiža) for about 350 years. Later estate was divided and new Felicianova Manor established.

See also
List of palaces and manor houses in Latvia

References

External links

  Eversmuiža Manor
 
 

Manor houses in Latvia